Charles Teo AM (born 24 December 1957) is an Australian neurosurgeon.

Early life and education
Teo was born to Chinese-Singaporean parents who immigrated to Australia. He attended The Scots College and the University of New South Wales, graduating with a Bachelor of Medicine, Bachelor of Surgery in 1981.

Career
Charlie Teo started in general neurosurgery at Royal Prince Alfred Hospital before moving to the United States. He completed a fellowship in Dallas, Texas, where he became the only Australian neurosurgeon certified by a US medical board. Teo spent almost ten years in the United States where he was an Associate Professor of Neurosurgery and Chief of Pediatric Neurosurgery at the Arkansas Children's Hospital.

Upon his return to Australia, he was self-appointed as the director of the Centre for Minimally Invasive Neurosurgery which he established at the Prince of Wales Hospital, and is the founder of Cure Brain Cancer Foundation (formerly Cure For Life Foundation), and the founder of the Charlie Teo Foundation.

Over the course of his career, Teo developed an international reputation in the field of minimally-invasive (or ‘keyhole’) neurosurgery. Teo has been an invited speaker and visiting professor in more than thirty-five countries, associated with institutions such as Johns Hopkins University, Stanford University, Albert Einstein University, Marburg University and the Barrow Neurological Institute in Phoenix, Arizona. Teo has written more than thirty book chapters and numerous scholarly papers. While still teaching regularly in the US, he also teaches and sponsors the education of neurosurgeons from developing countries, including Peru, Vietnam, Bangladesh, and Romania; and he treats children from developing countries with neurological conditions.

Notable patients of Teo include Jane McGrath, Dr Chris O'Brien, and Stan Zemanek. Author Susan Wyndham detailed a story about Teo and the pianist Aaron McMillan, a patient, in her biography, Life in his Hands. Sally White, a patient of Teo's, wrote of her experiences in Three Quotes From A Plumber: How a Second Opinion Changed the Life of a Woman with a Brain Tumour. Teo was featured in several TV programs including the ABC's Q&A, Good Medicine, 60 Minutes, Last Chance Surgery, Australian Story, Enough Rope and Anh's Brush with Fame. The 'Reader’s Digest Most Trusted Australian' was an annual trust survey, where participants rated their level of trust of a high-profile Australian out of 10. Teo appeared first or in the Top 5 for several years; and was rated most trusted Australian in 2012, 2013, and 2014.

In 2011, Teo was appointed a Member of the Order of Australia for service to medicine as a neurosurgeon through the introduction of minimally invasive techniques, as a researcher, educator and mentor, and through the establishment of the Cure for Life Foundation. Teo gave the 50th Anniversary Errol Solomon Meyers Memorial Lecture at the University of Queensland in August 2007. Teo gave the 2012 Australia Day speech on 23 January 2012.

Some elements of the media have claimed Teo has worked miracles. In May 2019, controversy arose when a prominent urologist, Professor Henry Woo, commented on the large number of GoFundMe campaigns requesting considerable sums of money for patients to have surgery done by Teo, when Australia's public health system should be performing any required surgery in the public system. Professor Woo also questioned the absence of peer reviewed evidence that Teo’s operative approach was beneficial to patients with incurable brain cancer.  In 2021 the NSW Medical Council conducted a special hearing into Teo's behaviours during surgical procedures; and, following investigation, was prevented from performing any "recurrent malignant intracranial tumour and brain stem tumour surgical procedures" unless he obtained written approval from an independent neurosurgeon, as approved by the NSW Medical Council. , Teo was also under investigation by the Health Care Complaints Commission. After a lengthy investigation by the Commission, Teo was due to appear for a disciplinary hearing in September 2022.

In 2022, it was reported that Teo is performing surgeries in Spain, which is beyond the regulatory powers of the NSW Medical Council. On 23 October 2022, a Sydney Morning Herald article described how Teo charged families extraordinary amounts of money and gave hope for a cure for ultimately futile operations that have catastrophically injured his patients. The article discussed two cases of operations on children with Diffuse Intrinsic Pontine Glioma (DIPG), an inoperable tumour, which, despite Teo's reassurance to their families that these surgeries could cure DIPG, did not provide a cure. In an interview on A Current Affair, Teo sought to justify his interventions. In a Podcast with Mark Bouris, Teo would claim that the accusations being leveled against him are from business rivals and personal enemies. During the hearing, it was reported that Teo slapped a patient who was unconscious in front of the patients family. Teo's conduct has been criticised by other neurosurgeons.

Personal life 
Teo was married to Genevieve Teo (née Agnew); the couple have four daughters. They separated in 2018. Teo is engaged  to former international model, Traci Griffiths. Traci Griffiths was diagnosed with a brain tumour in 2011. Teo was her treating surgeon.

Since 2009, Teo has been a council member for Australian animal welfare group Voiceless.

References

External links
 The Centre For Minimally Invasive Neorosurgery
 Charles Teo's professional biography
 Cure Brain Cancer Foundation
  Resume summary
  UNSWTV profile

1957 births
Australian people of Chinese descent
Australian people of Singaporean descent
Living people
Members of the Order of Australia
Australian neurosurgeons
People educated at Scots College (Sydney)
Medical doctors from Sydney
University of New South Wales Medical School alumni